Round Grove is an unincorporated community in Whiteside County, in the U.S. state of Illinois.

History
A post office called Round Grove was established in 1839, and remained in operation until it was discontinued in 1973. The community was named from a "large round grove" near the original town site.

References

Unincorporated communities in Whiteside County, Illinois
Unincorporated communities in Illinois